Trentavious Zamon White (August 2, 1987 – March 4, 2016), better known by his stage name Bankroll Fresh or Yung Fresh, was an American rapper from Atlanta, Georgia. Fresh is best known for his 2015 single "Walked In". He starred in the independent short film Take Over Your Trap in 2016.

Career
White originally rapped under the alias Yung Fresh, and under this alias appeared alongside Gucci Mane on multiple records. In 2014, Fresh collaborated with Mike Will Made It, on the song "Screen Door". Fresh later also made a guest appearance on song "For the Love", which appeared on Metro Boomin's 2013 mixtape 19 & Boomin. Fresh had a hit of his own with the 2014 single "Hot Boy", and the same year, he released the mixtape Life of a Hot Boy. In 2015, Fresh released Life of a Hot Boy 2, and later that year, Fresh followed it up with a self-titled mixtape. In February 2016, he released a video for his song "Poppin' Shit".
Fresh was also featured on Jeezy's hit "All There". The music video was released posthumously. Jeezy dedicated it to Fresh, filming the video in his hood with Fresh's family.

Death
After an altercation with childhood friend Atlanta rapper No Plug, Fresh was shot at Street Execs studio and later died at Hughes Spalding Hospital in Atlanta on March 4, 2016.  It was reported that more than 50 shell casings were at the scene of the crime. Many celebrities and friends including Chris Brown, 2 Chainz, Post Malone, Lil Wayne, Left Brain and Plies, along with his two children, family and friends, mourned the death of the rapper.

Post Malone mentioned Bankroll on his song, "Money Made Me Do It", featuring 2 Chainz, on his debut album, Stoney, released at the end of the year. The track pays tribute to the deceased rapper. Juice Wrld referenced Bankroll as well in a version of one of his songs from his album Death Race for Love  "Out My Way". Green Gartside of Scritti Politti has also wrote a song dedicated to the rapper, titled Trentavious White and introduced it as part of his 2021 touring setlist. No Plug later said in an online interview that he shot in self-defense; he was not charged or called a suspect. The investigation of Fresh's death was closed in June, 2018 after authorities stated that Fresh fired the first rounds with an SKS-style firearm at the vehicle of No Plug and his entourage outside of the Street Execs studio, saying that the returning gunfire from No Plug's passengers – which hit Fresh – was an act of self-defense.

Discography

Studio album 
 In Bank We Trust (2020)
 Bank Of Amerikka (2022)

Mixtapes 
 Street Motivation (2012)
 Life of a Hot Boy (2015)
 Life of a Hot Boy 2: Real Trapper (2015)
 Rock Solid (with Zaytoven) (Unreleased)
 Bankroll Fresh (2015)
 Made It Through Tha Struggle (2016)
 Live Yo Life (2018)

Singles 
 Show Em How To Do It (2014)
 Hot Boy (2015)
 Dirty Game (2016)
 Truth Be Told (2017)
 Hell of a Night (2017)
 Can't Catch Me (2018)
 MIND, BODY, SOUL (2019)
 Believe It (2019)
 Whole 4 (2020)

As lead artist

As featured artist

Notes

References

1987 births
2016 deaths
African-American male rappers
American male rappers
Deaths by firearm in Georgia (U.S. state)
Murdered African-American people
American murder victims
People murdered in Georgia (U.S. state)
Rappers from Atlanta
Gangsta rappers
2016 murders in the United States
20th-century African-American people
21st-century African-American people